Douglas Blackburn (6 August 1857, Southwark – 28 March 1929, Tonbridge) was an English journalist and novelist, who worked in the Transvaal and Natal between 1892 and 1908. He has been called "the great chronicler of the last days of the Boer republic."

Telepathy experiments

During 1882-1883, Blackburn with George Albert Smith took part in a series of experiments that were claimed to be genuine evidence for telepathy by members of the Society for Psychical Research. Blackburn later made a public confession of fraud, stating that the results had been obtained by use of a code.

Blackburn's Confessions of a Telepathist: Thirty-Year Hoax Exposed appeared in The Daily News and the Journal of the Society for Psychical Research, 1911. It was re-printed in A Skeptics Handbook of Parapsychology, 1985.

Works
Novels
Prinsloo of Prinsloosdorp: A Tale of Transvaal Officialdom, 1899
A Burgher Quixote, 1903
Richard Hartley, Prospector, 1904
I Came and Saw, 1908
Leaven, 1908
Love Muti, Everett's, 1915

Non-fiction
 Thought-Reading, or, Modern Mysteries Explained: Being Chapters on Thought-Reading, Occultism, Mesmerism, &c., Forming a Key to the Psychological Puzzles of the Day, 1884
 (with W. C. Caddell) The Detection of Forgery: A Practical Handbook For the Use of Bankers, Solicitors, Magistrates' Clerks, and All Handling Suspected Documents, 1909
 Confessions of a Telepathist, 1911
 (with W. C. Caddell) Secret Service in South Africa, 1911
 The Martyr Nurse: The Death and Achievement of Edith Cavell, 1915

References

Further reading

External links
 
 
 

1857 births
1929 deaths
20th-century English novelists
English fraudsters
English male journalists
English male novelists
Parapsychologists
South African journalists
South African male novelists
Telepaths
20th-century English male writers